The Institute of Modern Russia (IMR) is a nonprofit, nonpartisan public policy organization—a think tank—headquartered in New York City. It was founded in February 2010, by leading experts in Russia-US relations and human rights. According to the Institute's mission statement, "through its research, advocacy, public events, and grant-making, IMR is committed to fostering democratic values, respect for human rights and the rule of law, and the development of civil society in Russia; the promotion of a principles-based U.S.-Russia dialogue; and the integration of a modern and forward-looking Russia into the community of democracies".

The president of IMR is Pavel Khodorkovsky, the son of Mikhail Khodorkovsky; the Institute's advisors include Vladimir V. Kara-Murza, Richard Sakwa and Andrei Piontkovsky. Lyudmila Alexeyeva was a Trustee of the Institute.

IMR is a federal tax-exempt Section 501(c)(3) public charity, incorporated in New Jersey.

The Institute ran a special project called The Interpreter, a daily online journal committed to translating Russian-language media and blogs into English and publishing original features, reports, op-eds, and interviews, with the goal of making the Russian-speaking world accessible to Western journalists, analysts, policymakers, diplomats, and laymen. In January 2016, the magazine was  absorbed by Radio Free Europe/Radio Liberty.

References

External links
 
 

Nonpartisan organizations in the United States
501(c)(3) organizations
Think tanks established in 2010
2010 establishments in New York City
Freedom of expression organizations
Human rights organizations based in the United States
Organizations based in New York City
Organizations based in Washington, D.C.
Political and economic think tanks in the United States
Russia–United States relations